Arun Alat (born 6 October 1988) is an Indian playback singer, music composer and Lyricist who made a space in Malayalam film industry as a singer with his debut song "Swapnamoru Chaakku" from the 2010 film Best Actor.

Musical career

In 2010, soon after completing his Btech in Civil engineering at Mar Athanasius College of Engineering, Kothamangalam, He got into playback singing. National award-winning music director Bijibal introduced him through the song 'Swapnamoru Chakku'. After that He has been collaborating with many leading musicians in Malayalam for different film and non-film projects.

Arun Alat had worked as a Civil Engineer in an Architectural-Structural-project management company in Kochi [FormsIndia] for more than two years during the initial stage of his music career. In 2013, he left his engineering job aside to concentrate fully on his music projects.

Discography

As singer

As lyricist

As Composer

Indie Music

References 

 I learn something from every musician: Arun
 His musical idiom : The Hindu

External links 
 Arun Alat at Facebook
 

Living people
1988 births
Malayalam playback singers
Indian male singers